Srikanth is an Indian Film Editor and Television Producer who has worked in the film industry since 2007. He has worked in Kannada, Hindi, English and Telugu language films.

Career
Srikanth joined as an Office Boy at Visionworld, Bangalore in 1996. Later he joined in Mohan studio and then in Balaji Telefilms and worked for many famous serials like Maneyondhu Mooru Baagilu, Kunkuma Bhagya and many others produced by Balaji Telefilms and worked for Documentaries, Feature Films, Corporate films, Commercials and fiction episodes, and in Suprabhata Channel, Udaya TV, ETV, ZEE TV Channels. He started his own studio in 2003 by name "Srikanth Studios", and produced a serial Katakateya kathegalu which was telecasted in Zee Kannada. He worked on Documentary for Film Division Mumbai  - “GANGA KAVERI” in the year 2009, on “PLASTIC Waste AWARENESS” for BBMP and some of the production are in pipelines. He is the co-producer for the Madipu Tulu film, which had won both National Award and Karnataka State Award. Srikanth has produced a Kannada Serial Varalakshmi Stores which telecasts on Star Suvarna Channel. He has edited big films like KGF, Ugramm.

Filmography

Albums and Short Films

References

Living people
Kannada film editors
Film editors from Karnataka
Year of birth missing (living people)